Michael Chang defeated Alberto Mancini in the final, 7–5, 7–5 to win the men's singles tennis title at the 1992 Miami Open. With the win, he completed the Sunshine Double.

Jim Courier was the defending champion, but lost in the semifinals to Chang.

Seeds
All seeds receive a bye into the second round.

Draw

Finals

Top half

Section 1

Section 2

Section 3

Section 4

Bottom half

Section 5

Section 6

Section 7

Section 8

References
General

Specific

1992 ATP Tour
Men's Singles
1992 in American sports